Indisulam is a chloroindolyl sulfonamide cell cycle inhibitor that exhibits antitumor activity in vitro and in an animal model. This compound affects cell cycle progression in human tumor cells and is being studied for the treatment of cancers such as melanomas and blood-borne cancers such as leukemia.

References 

Experimental cancer drugs
Indoles
Sulfonamides